The Young Italy was the youth wing of the Italian Social Movement from 1954 to 1971.

History
At the Rome conference, which sanctioned the foundation of Young Italy as an autonomous national body, albeit linked to the Italian Social Movement and in which over 200 young people representing the provincial associations set up in the various regions participate, Massimo Anderson was elected first Secretary General and Fabio De Felice was elected president.

In 1971 Anderson and Pietro Cerullo brought together the "Young Italy" and the "Students and Workers Youth Rally" in a new political entity called Youth Front, with Anderson as secretary and Cerullo as president.

Ideology 
According to Evola, the concept of life provided was "spiritualistic" and contrasted with the "materialist" one of Marxism.

National secretaries
Fabio De Felice (1954–1955)
Angelo Nicosia (1955–1957)
Fausto Gianfranceschi (1957–1966)
Massimo Anderson (1966–1969)
Pietro Cerullo (1969–1971)

References

1954 establishments in Italy
1971 disestablishments in Italy
Youth wings of conservative parties
Youth wings of political parties in Italy
Neo-fascist organisations in Italy
Youth wings of fascist parties